Dan-Air Flight 1008 was a fatal accident involving a Boeing 727-46 jet aircraft operated by Dan Air Services Limited on an unscheduled international passenger service from Manchester to Tenerife. The crash occurred on 25 April 1980 in a forest on Tenerife's Mount La Esperanza when the aircraft's flight deck crew wrongly executed an unpublished holding pattern in an area of very high ground; it resulted in the aircraft's destruction and the deaths of all 146 on board (138 passengers and eight crew). Flight 1008 was Dan-Air's second major accident in 10 years and the worst accident involving the deaths of fare-paying passengers in the airline's entire history.

Aircraft history and crew information
The aircraft, operated by Dan Air Services Ltd, was a Boeing 727-46 (construction/manufacturer's serial number: 19279, line number: 288, registration ) that had its first flight in 1966. Dan-Air acquired the aircraft in August 1974.

At the time of the accident, the airframe had accumulated 30,600 hours.

The captain and pilot in command was 50-year-old Arthur John Whelan, who had flown to Tenerife North Airport 58 times previously. He had 15,299 flight hours, including 1,912 hours on the Boeing 727. The first officer was 33-year-old Michael John Firth, who had flown to Tenerife North Airport 9 times previously. He had 3,492 flight hours, including 618 hours on the Boeing 727. The flight engineer was 33-year-old Raymond John Carey, who had never flown to Tenerife North Airport before. He had 3,340 hours, though his experience on the Boeing 727 is not stated in the report.

Flight history
Flight 1008 was a charter flight from Manchester Airport, United Kingdom, to Tenerife North Airport, Canary Islands, Spain. Initially at flight level (FL) 110 (about ), Dan-Air 1008 was then cleared to descend to FL 60 (about ). The crew reported overhead 'TFN' and was requested to join a nonstandard holding pattern over the 'FP' beacon. This holding pattern was not a published procedure and the crew did not have a chart for it, but the instruction was accepted. In fact, the aircraft did not pass over 'FP', but instead flew to the south of the beacon and called "entering the hold".

When during the aircraft's descent towards  the ground proximity warning system (GPWS) activated, the crew reacted quickly and initiated a climb. With the engines at full power, the aircraft entered a steep turn to the right and struck Mount La Esperanza at 13:21:15 local time. The aircraft was flying in cloud when it struck the mountain.

Accident investigation and cause
The official (Spanish) investigation concluded that the cause of the accident was that the pilot in command, without taking account of the altitude at which he was flying, took the aircraft into an area of high terrain and thereby failed to maintain a safe height above the terrain. A British addendum to the report found that tardy and ambiguous directions from air traffic control regarding the unpublished hold directly contributed to the disorientation of the aircraft commander. The addendum also found that the unpublished track onto which the aircraft was directed required tight turns to be flown. These were practically unflyable, making entry into the region of high ground inevitable for an aircraft flying this track, even without the navigational errors made by Dan-Air 1008. The addendum concluded that the accident would not have occurred if the aircraft had not been cleared below .

Memorial in Southern Cemetery, Manchester

A memorial in Southern Cemetery, Manchester commemorates the victims of the disaster, whose names are inscribed on a series of slate tablets within a small grassed enclosure. Also, a garden of remembrance exists aside of All Saints Church in Taoro Parque (Puerto de la Cruz, Tenerife), as passengers of the descended flight were members of the Anglican Parish there.

See also

Air China Flight 129
Air Inter Flight 148
Flydubai Flight 981
Garuda Indonesia Flight 152
Thai Airways International Flight 311
Korean Air Flight 801

Notes

References
 UK CAA Document CAA 429 World Airline Accident Summary
 Final Report – Spanish Civil Aviation Accident Commission
 English translation hosted by the UK Air Accidents Investigation Branch: Report No.8/1981 Report on the accident to Boeing 727, G-BDAN on Tenerife, Canary Islands, 25 April 1980 (Archive).
Appendices of English version (Archive)
 Original Spanish version available on request from the Civil Aviation Accident and Incident Investigation Commission

Further reading
 The Spirit of Dan-Air, Simons, G.M., GMS Enterprises, Peterborough, 1993
 Kompass – Winter 1974/75 Edition, Dan Air Services Ltd, West Berlin, 1974 
 Berlin Airport Company — Report on Dan-Air's Berlin operation, July 1975 Monthly Timetable Booklet for Berlin Tempelhof and Berlin Tegel Airports, Berlin Airport Company, West Berlin, 1975 
 In Flight – Silver Jubilee Anniversary Edition, Dan Air Services Ltd, London, 1978
 Airliner Classics (Dan-Air – Popular British Charter operator: The Boeing 727), Key Publishing, Stamford, UK, November 2011

External links

 Aviation Safety Network
 Airline Profile: Number Forty-Three in the Series – Dan-Air, Flight International, 31 May 1973, pp. 836/7
 Airline Profile: Number Forty-Three in the Series – Dan-Air, Flight International, 31 May 1973, p. 839
 Dan-Air: cautious optimism, Air Transport, Flight International, 31 October 1974, p. 589
 Dan-Air Boeing 727-46 G-BDAN at Manchester Airport on 5 April 1980 (photo)

Aviation accidents and incidents in 1980
Airliner accidents and incidents involving controlled flight into terrain
Aviation accidents and incidents in Spain
Accidents and incidents involving the Boeing 727
Dan-Air accidents and incidents
1980 in Spain
Tenerife
Disasters in the Canary Islands
April 1980 events in Europe